Pediacus depressus is a species of flat bark beetle in the family Cucujidae. It is found in Europe and Northern Asia (excluding China).

References

Further reading

External links

 

Cucujidae
Articles created by Qbugbot
Beetles described in 1797